Hrvoje Sunara (born 4 August 1979) is a Croatian former professional footballer who played as a goalkeeper, and is currently the goalkeeping coach of both the Croatia national under-21 team and Hajduk Split.

Career
A product of Hajduk Split youth academy, Sunara was promoted to their first squad in July 1999 at the age of 20. He spent the following five years with the club, mostly being their second or third choice goalkeeper, which saw him earning a mere 10 appearances for the club. In 2004, he was transferred to Israeli side Hapoel Be'er Sheva, only to return to Croatia in July 2005. After stints with Croatian lower level sides Pomorac and Slavonac CO, he signed for NK Karlovac in July 2009, as one of the players brought in to reinforce the club for their first ever top flight season. After terminating his contract with Karlovac through arbitration in February 2012, he joined RNK Split.

Sunara was considered a promising player when he was younger, and was capped seven times for Croatia's U-20 and U-21 selections between 1998 and 2001, and was part of the squad which competed at the 1999 FIFA World Youth Championship.

References

External links
 

1979 births
Living people
Footballers from Split, Croatia
Association football goalkeepers
Croatian footballers
Croatia youth international footballers
Croatia under-21 international footballers
HNK Hajduk Split players
Hapoel Be'er Sheva F.C. players
NK Pomorac 1921 players
NK Karlovac players
RNK Split players
Croatian Football League players
Israeli Premier League players
Croatian expatriate footballers
Expatriate footballers in Israel
Croatian expatriate sportspeople in Israel
HNK Hajduk Split non-playing staff
Association football goalkeeping coaches